Dålk Island is a small coastal island lying at the terminus of Dålk Glacier, in the southeast part of Prydz Bay. It was mapped by Norwegian cartographers from aerial photographs taken by the Lars Christensen Expedition (1936–37) and named Dålkoy.

See also 
 List of antarctic and sub-antarctic islands

References
 

Islands of Princess Elizabeth Land